All observances begin at sunset the day prior to the Gregorian date listed unless otherwise noted, and end on nightfall of the date in question, which is defined as the appearance of three stars in the sky.  On leap years (which occur every 2–3 years) an extra month, Adar II, is added and certain holidays move accordingly, and it is mentioned in the notes section. All fasts other than Yom Kippur and Tisha b'Av begin at dawn of the day listed.

Holidays for the Jewish calendar year of 5781 (2020–2021)
Yom tov for the Three Pilgrimage Festivals (Pesach, Shavuot, and Sukkot)  is observed for 1 day in Israel and in Reform and most Reconstructionist communities around the world, and is observed for 2 days in Orthodox and most Conservative communities outside Israel, because of yom tov sheni shel galuyot.  In the table, these are referred to as 1-day and 2-day communities.

Non-annual observances
Jewish calendar year 5782 - Shmita - September 7, 2021 - September 25, 2022 (Observed every seven years)
Jewish calendar year 5783 - Hakhel - Observed every seven years, comes after Shimita year.
Purim Meshulash - Rare calendar occurrence when Purim in Jerusalem falls on Shabbat. The next time this will happen is 2021.
Purim Katan - Minor Purim celebration on Adar I during leap years. Purim itself is celebrated in Adar II. The next time this will happen is the Jewish year 5782, on February 14, 2022.
23 Nisan 5797 - Birkat Hachama -  April 8, 2037 (Observed every 28 years)

See also
Jewish astrology
List of Gregorian Jewish-related and Israeli holidays

References

External links
https://www.myzmanim.com/search.aspx, Myzmanim, a Halachic sunset and nightfall calculator for time zone
http://www.hebcal.com/hebcal
http://www.chabad.org/calendar/

Hebrew calendar